Lake Mulwala, a manmade reservoir created through the construction of the Yarrawonga Weir across the Murray River, is located between  and  in Hume region of Victoria and  in the Riverina region of New South Wales, in eastern Australia. The weir was constructed in 1939 to provide water for irrigation of the surrounding district. The weir also serves as a crossing of the Murray between the two towns; in addition to the crossing located via the Mulwala Bridge.

Location and features

The road bridge across the lake was built before the lake was filled, commenced in 1917 and completed in 1924. It replaced an earlier wooden bridge built in 1889–1891. The bridge was started from both ends, each by the respective state government. However, they did not coordinate their efforts, and the bridge has a dip and a bend in the middle to make the two ends meet.

The Yarrawonga weir is the farthest downstream obstruction across the Murray that does not have a navigation lock through it. The weir is  upriver from the river mouth.

Lake Mulwala is a renowned fishery for the native Murray Cod and is one of the few places where this Australian native freshwater fish is still reasonably common.

See also

List of lakes of New South Wales
List of lakes of Victoria

References

External links
Yarrawonga - Mulwala tourism

Lakes of New South Wales
Lakes of Victoria (Australia)
Goulburn Broken catchment
Rivers of Hume (region)
Murray River
River regulation in Australia
Riverina
Mulwala, New South Wales